Sørkjosen is a village in Nordreisa Municipality in Troms og Finnmark county, Norway. Sørkjosen has many industries including fishing, dairy production, and a sawmill.

Nord-Troms Museum 

Sørkjosen hosts several preserved historical buildings that are part of the Nord-Troms Museum. The other exhibitions are in neighboring municipalities of Lyngen, Storfjord, Kåfjord, Skjervøy, and Kvænangen.

Transport 
The European route E6 highway connects Sørkjosen with the town of Alta (and the rest of Finnmark) to the east, and the city of Tromsø to the west. Sørkjosen Airport is located within the urban area of the village, on the shore of Reisafjorden, at its southern end. Widerøe provides air services to Tromsø, Hammerfest, and Kirkenes from Sørkjosen.

References

Villages in Troms
Nordreisa
Populated places of Arctic Norway